Ellis Alfred Swearengen (July 8, 1845 – November 15, 1904) was an American pimp and entertainment entrepreneur who ran the Gem Theater, a notorious brothel, in Deadwood, South Dakota, for 22 years during the late 19th century.

Personal life
Swearengen (sometimes spelled Swearingen, Swearengin, Swearngir, Swegen, etc.) and his twin brother Lemuel were the eldest two of eight children of Dutch American farmer Daniel J. Swearingen and Keziah "Katie" Montgomery of Oskaloosa, Iowa. Swearengen remained at home well into his adult years and only arrived in Deadwood in May 1876, with his wife, Nettie Swearengen. Nettie later divorced him on the grounds of spousal abuse. Swearengen married two more times; both of these marriages ended in divorce.

Deadwood

Swearengen originally owned and operated a canvas-and-lumber saloon in Deadwood known as the Cricket, which featured gambling and hosted prizefights. Shortly afterward, he closed it down and opened a larger saloon known as the Gem Theater.

The Gem functioned as a saloon, dance hall, and brothel. Swearengen lured desperate young women to Deadwood, then forced them into prostitution through a combination of bullying and physical brutality committed by him and his henchmen. Calamity Jane, who was one of his first dancers at the Gem, procured 10 girls from Sidney, Nebraska for him on one occasion.

The results were highly lucrative: the Gem earned a nightly average of $5,000, and sometimes as much as $10,000. The Gem burned down on September 26, 1879, along with much of the town, but Swearengen rebuilt his establishment larger and more opulent than ever, to great public acclaim.

Swearengen's talent for making canny alliances and financial payoffs kept him insulated from the general drive to clean up Deadwood, including the otherwise successful work of Seth Bullock, the town's first sheriff.

In 1899, the Gem burned down once again and was not rebuilt. The same year,  Swearengen left Deadwood and married Odelia Turgeon.

Death
It is often reported that Swearengen died penniless while trying to hop a freight train, but research suggests he was murdered. According to his rediscovered obituary and contemporaneous newspaper accounts, Swearengen was found dead in the middle of a suburban Denver street on November 15, 1904, apparently of a massive head wound. Less than two months earlier, his twin brother Lemuel had been shot by unknown assailants and survived, although suspiciously was not robbed.

In popular culture

From 2004 to 2006, the television series Deadwood depicted Swearengen as a powerful and influential figure in the early history of the town, ruthlessly murderous and abusive, but ultimately guiding it toward its development and annexation to the Dakota Territory once he comes to see this course as fitting his best interests. The series altered Swearengen to be English-born, and also changed his first name to Albert. The English actor Ian McShane won a Golden Globe Award for Best Actor in a Television Drama in 2005 for his portrayal of Swearengen. He was also nominated that year for Emmy and Screen Actors Guild Awards, and TV Guide named him #6 in its 2013 list of The 60 Nastiest Villains of All Time. The series also altered timelines; it shows the Gem (historically opened in April 1877) as a going concern during the famous events of August 1876.

McShane reprised his role of Swearengen in Deadwood: The Movie (2019), which takes place in 1889, 10 years after the series ended.

Brian W Foster portrays him in Undeadwood on the critical role youtube channel, where he is the Game Master for the ttrpg they are playing that is set in Deadwood.

See also
List of unsolved murders

References

External links
Deadwood Genealogy
"Swearengen likely murdered, research indicates" Black Hills Pioneer. July 24,2007
"The real Al Swearengen died near Alameda and Santa Fe. Was his death an accident or murder?" 9news Denver CO. June 3, 2019

1845 births
1904 deaths
1904 murders in the United States
19th-century American businesspeople
19th-century American people
20th-century American people
American crime bosses
American people of Dutch descent
American pimps
Deaths from head injury
People from Deadwood, South Dakota
People from Oskaloosa, Iowa
People murdered in Colorado
People of the American Old West
Unsolved murders in the United States